Heteroglenea nigromaculata is a species of beetle in the family Cerambycidae. It was described by James Thomson in 1865. It is known from Laos, China, Thailand, Myanmar, Cambodia, Vietnam, Philippines and India . It feeds on Streblus asper.

References

Saperdini
Beetles described in 1865